Bang's theorem may refer to:

 The solution to Tarski's plank problem by Thøger Bang (1917–1997)
 A special case of Zsigmondy's theorem, on unique divisors of Mersenne numbers
 Bang's theorem on tetrahedra, posed by A. S. Bang in 1897